The discography of Sunny Day Real Estate, a Seattle rock band. 

During their first period between 1992 and 1995, they released 2 studio albums and 5 singles. A reunion in 1997 saw the band put out 2 more studio albums, a live album and another single, before their second breakup in 2001

Following another reunion tour in 2009, the band began work on 5th album. It was later announced in 2013 that work on this album had fallen through and that the group had again disbanded. Only one song would be released, posthumously from these sessions.

Studio albums

Live albums

Extended plays

Songs

Singles

Compilation appearances

B-sides

Songs re-recorded for albums

Video albums

Music videos

Splits

Demo albums

Tribute albums
 The Covers Were The Stairs (2006)
 20 Jahre Intro Magazine - Part 6: Emo (2011, Ltd. Edition 7" Picture Vinyl, German band Adolar covering "Song About An Angel")

References

Rock music group discographies
 
Discographies of American artists